Valentinlyst is a neighborhood in the city of Trondheim in Trøndelag county, Norway. It is located in the borough of Lerkendal.  It is south of the neighborhood of Persaunet, north of Moholt, west of Tunga, and east of Tyholt.

References

External links
Valentinlyst senter website

Neighbourhoods of Trondheim
Geography of Trondheim